Mike Cabellon is an American actor and comedian known for his roles in Mr. Mayor and Orange Is the New Black. Cabellon has been a member of the Upright Citizens Brigade.

Filmography

Film

Television

References 

Living people
American male television actors
American male comedians
21st-century American male actors
21st-century American comedians
Year of birth missing (living people)